Hendrik Pieter 'Hennie' le Roux (born 10 July 1967), is a former South African rugby union player who played for the South Africa national rugby union team.

He was the president of the players' union, which was founded in 1997.

Career

Provincial 
Le Roux represented the  schools' team at the 1986 Craven Week tournament and in 1987 he played for the Eastern Province under–20 team. In 1996 he played Super Rugby for the Transvaal, when the South African provinces still participated and from 1998, he played for the  under the franchise structure.

International
He played his first test match for the Springboks on 26 June 1993 against France. His last test was on 15 December 1996 against Wales. He also played in 24 tour matches scoring 56 points for the Springboks.

Test history
 World Cup Final

World Cup
 1995 South Africa World Cup winners : 6 games (Wallabies, Romania, Canada, Samoa, France, All Blacks).

See also
List of South Africa national rugby union players – Springbok no. 572

References

External links
 Springboks site
scrum.com statistics

South African rugby union players
South Africa international rugby union players
1967 births
Living people
Alumni of Graeme College
Golden Lions players
Lions (United Rugby Championship) players
Rugby union centres
Rugby union fly-halves
Rugby union players from the Eastern Cape